Oluwasemilogo Adesewo Ibidapo "Semi" Ajayi (born 9 November 1993) is a professional footballer who plays as a defender or defensive midfielder for  club West Bromwich Albion and the Nigeria national football team.

Club career

Charlton Athletic
Born to Nigerian parents, Ajayi began his football career as a youth product of the Charlton Athletic academy. After progressing through the Charlton Athletic ranks, he was offered his first professional contract in January 2012.

In November 2012, Ajayi joined Dartford on a short-term loan for twenty-eight days. Shortly after, he made his Dartford debut, in a 4–0 win over Kingstonian in the FA Trophy and then scored his first goal for the side, in a 3–2 loss against Tamworth. Ajayi played 3 games and scored 1 goal before returning to his parent club in late-December.

After returning to Charlton Athletic, Ajayi played for the reserve side for the rest of the season and helped win the Professional Development League 2. Along the way, he was as an unused substitute in the senior side for a game against Blackpool on 12 January 2013.

Arsenal
Shortly before he was due to make his debut for the Charlton first team, Ajayi caught the eye of Premier League team Arsenal. Ajayi joined the Arsenal Academy on a two-year deal after impressing as a trialist with the club in September 2013.

Ajayi made his Arsenal U21 debut as a trialist against Blackburn Rovers on 30 August 2013, scoring with a header, in a 3–0 win. Ajayi, who first figured for Arsenal's senior team in a friendly against Boreham Wood, made the Arsenal bench four times during the 2014–15 season. He was an unused substitute in games against Hull City, Stoke City and Newcastle in the Premier League, as well as in the home League Cup defeat by Southampton.

Cardiff City
On 25 March 2015, Ajayi joined Championship team Cardiff City on loan until the end of the 2014–15 season but did not feature for the first team. At the end of the season, Ajayi joined Cardiff on a two-year permanent deal following the end of his contract at Arsenal

In the 2014–15 season, Ajayi was given a number twenty-nine shirt for the new season. However, Ajayi appeared twice as an unused substitute, both of them came in the League Cup campaign against AFC Wimbledon and MK Dons.

Loan spells
On 29 September 2015, Ajayi joined League Two side AFC Wimbledon on a month loan deal. He made his debut for the Dons on the same day in a 1–1 draw against Northampton Town. After impressing in his first couple of games, he was keen to extend his loan spell at AFC Wimbledon for more first team opportunities. However, after making five appearances for the side, Ajayi returned to his parent club at the end of the original loan period.

On 26 November 2015, Ajayi joined League One side Crewe Alexandra on loan until 5 January 2016. After his debut against Oldham Athletic two days later, Ajayi was named in the Football League Team of the Week which covers all three Football League divisions. Following several more impressive displays for Crewe, his loan spell was extended to 27 February, the maximum 93-day term allowed under the emergency loan rule. On 13 February 2016, with chances of further loan extension reported as slim, he set up a goal for Brad Inman in a 1–1 draw against Walsall. After making his last appearance against Chesterfield on 20 February 2016, he returned to his parent club.

Rotherham United
On 30 January 2017, Ajayi signed a loan deal until the end of the 2016–17 season with fellow Championship strugglers Rotherham United. The following day, he made his Rotherham United debut, starting and playing the whole game, in a 2–0 defeat against Nottingham Forest. Several weeks later, on 14 February 2017, he scored his first Rotherham United goal, in a 3–2 defeat against Huddersfield Town. Ajayi was a first team regular for the rest of the season and made seventeen appearances. On 28 March 2017, Ajayi signed for the club on a permanent deal, to be completed on 1 July 2017. He was part of the side which earned promotion to The Championship after beating Shrewsbury in the play-off final on 27 May 2018.

On 12 April, he won the EFL Championship Player of the Month for March 2019. At the club's end of season awards for the 2018/19 season, Ajayi won the Away Player Of The Season Award after scoring 8 goals in 49 games in all competitions, and also the Goal of the Season for his long range strike against Leeds United in a 2–1 defeat on 26 January 2019.

West Bromwich Albion
On 20 July 2019, Ajayi signed for West Bromwich Albion for an undisclosed fee, agreeing a four-year contract with the club. On 27 December 2020, Ajayi scored his first Premier League goal for Albion in a 1–1 away draw against champions Liverpool.

International career
At the end of May 2013, Ajayi was called up to the Nigeria U20 squad for their 2013 Toulon Tournament matches.

After being an unused substitute on Matchday 1 against Mexico U20, Ajayi made his Nigeria U20 debut on 4 June 2013, in a 1–1 draw against Belgium U21. Ajayi went on to make two further appearances in the tournament against Portugal and Brazil. After the tournament ended, Ajayi commented that he was proud to play for the national side.

Ajayi received his first call up to the senior team in August 2018 for 2019 African Cup of Nations Qualifiers, he described it as a "dream" call up. He made his debut against Seychelles in the 2019 Nation cup qualifiers, coming on for the injured Chidozie Awaziem in the 73rd minute.

Career statistics

Honours
Rotherham United
EFL League One play-offs: 2018

Individual
EFL Championship Player of the Month: March 2019

References

External links

1993 births
Living people
People from Crayford
Footballers from the London Borough of Bexley
Citizens of Nigeria through descent
English footballers
Nigerian footballers
Nigeria under-20 international footballers
Nigeria international footballers
Association football defenders
Charlton Athletic F.C. players
Dartford F.C. players
Arsenal F.C. players
Cardiff City F.C. players
AFC Wimbledon players
Crewe Alexandra F.C. players
Rotherham United F.C. players
West Bromwich Albion F.C. players
National League (English football) players
English Football League players
Premier League players
English people of Nigerian descent
2021 Africa Cup of Nations players